The following Confederate Army units and commanders fought in the Atlanta campaign of the American Civil War. The Union order of battle is listed separately. Order of battle compiled from the army organization during the campaign.

This order of battle covers the period of July 17 – September 8, 1864. The period from May 1 – July 17, 1864 is listed separately.

Abbreviations used

Military rank
 Gen = General
 LTG = Lieutenant General
 MG = Major General
 BG = Brigadier General
 Col = Colonel
 Ltc = Lieutenant Colonel
 Maj = Major
 Cpt = Captain
 Lt = Lieutenant

Other
 w = wounded
 k = killed

Army of Tennessee
Gen John B. Hood
Chief of Staff: BG William Mackall, BG Francis Shoup
Chief of Artillery: BG Francis Shoup, Col Robert Beckham

Hardee's Corps
LTG William J. Hardee

Lee's Corps
MG Carter L. Stevenson
MG Benjamin F. Cheatham
LTG Stephen D. Lee

Stewart's Corps
LTG Alexander P. Stewart (w July 28)
MG Benjamin F. Cheatham

Cavalry Corps
MG Joseph Wheeler

Strengths
The following table shows total strengths of each of the major formations at several stages throughout the campaign.

Notes

References
 U.S. War Department, The War of the Rebellion: a Compilation of the Official Records of the Union and Confederate Armies. Washington, DC: U.S. Government Printing Office, 1880–1901.
 Luvaas, Jay & Harold W. Nelson (eds.). Guide to the Atlanta Campaign: Rocky Face Ridge to Kennesaw Mountain (Lawrence, KS: University Press of Kansas), 2008.  

American Civil War orders of battle
Order of battle, Confederate, 2nd